The Congo rope squirrel (Funisciurus congicus)  is a species of rodent in the family Sciuridae.
It is found in Angola, Democratic Republic of the Congo, and Namibia.
Its natural habitats are moist savanna, subtropical or tropical dry shrubland, and rocky areas.

References

Funisciurus
Rodents of Africa
Mammals described in 1820
Taxonomy articles created by Polbot